Calomyxa is a genus of slime molds belonging to the family Dianemataceae. It was first described in 1916 by Fr. Julius Nieuwland 

The genus has cosmopolitan distribution.

Species:

Calomyxa metallica 
Calomyxa synspora

References

Myxogastria
Amoebozoa genera